Bartošovice v Orlických horách is a municipality and village in Rychnov nad Kněžnou District in the Hradec Králové Region of the Czech Republic. It has about 200 inhabitants.

Geography
It lies in the Orlické Mountains. The municipality is situated along the border with Poland, which is formed by the Divoká Orlice River along its entire length.

History
The settlement of the area started in 1495, when Czech nobleman Jan Bartoušovský of Labouň bought this land with the right to establish a village. The first written mention of Bartošovice is from 1548.

Between 1938 and 1945, the municipality was annexed by Nazi Germany and administered as part of Reichsgau Sudetenland. After the World War II, the German population was expelled by the Beneš decrees.

Transport
In the municipality there is the road border crossing Bartošovice v Orlických horách / Niemojów with Poland.

Sights
The landmark of the village is the Church of Saint Mary Magdalene. This baroque church dates from 1673 and replaced an old wooden church building. It was reconstructed in 1906, after it was damaged by a fire.

References

External links

batzdorf.de.tl 

Villages in Rychnov nad Kněžnou District